Dalibor Řezníček (born August 25, 1991) is a Czech professional ice hockey player currently playing in the Czech Extraliga for the PSG Zlín.

References

External links

1991 births
Czech ice hockey defencemen
PSG Berani Zlín players
Living people
HC Olomouc players